V. indica may refer to:
 Vanessa indica, the Indian red admiral or in the United States, the Asian admiral, a butterfly species
Varmina indica, a species of moth
 Vateria indica, a plant species endemic to India
 Viverricula indica, the small Indian civet, a mammal species found across south and South-East Asia

Subspecies 
 Vachellia nilotica subsp. indica, the prickly acacia, a perennial tree

Synonyms
 Valsaria indica, a synonym for Valsaria insitiva, a plant pathogen species that causes perennial canker
Velella indica, a synonym for Velella velella, the purple sail, a free-floating hydrozoan

See also
 Indica (disambiguation)